This is a list of notable Old Richmondites, the alumni of Richmond College, Galle, Sri Lanka.

Politicians

Judiciary

Educationists

Civil servants

Arts

Sports

Medicine

References

External links
 Official Website
 Richmond College. org

 
Richmond College